Christine "Christa" Spielberg (born 21 December 1941) is a former German track and field athlete who competed in the women's discus throw.

She claimed the gold medal at the 1966 European Championships, and set the world record on 26 May 1968, reaching  in Regis-Breitingen.

She represented 1968 Summer Olympics and placed seventh in the final. She also placed second to compatriot Karin Illgen at the AAA Championships. She had the second-best throw of her career in the 1970 season, throwing  which ranked her fifth in the world that year. In the last major outing, she finished eighth at the 1971 European Athletics Championships. Her season's best of  that year made her the seventh best thrower for the season and was the final time she ranked in the top ten globally.

References 

Klaus Amrhein: Biographisches Handbuch zur Geschichte der Deutschen Leichtathletik 1898–2005.

1941 births
Living people
People from Glauchau
East German female discus throwers
Olympic athletes of East Germany
Athletes (track and field) at the 1968 Summer Olympics
Sportspeople from Saxony
European Athletics Championships medalists
World record setters in athletics (track and field)
Recipients of the Patriotic Order of Merit